Thomas Greaney (17 June 1909 – August 1999) was an Irish hurler. At club level he played for Dungarvan, winning a Waterford Senior Championship title in 1941, and was the centre-forward on the Waterford senior hurling team that lost the 1938 All-Ireland final.

References

1909 births
1999 deaths
Dungarvan hurlers
Waterford inter-county hurlers
Munster inter-provincial hurlers